Lieutenant General Daniel Webb (died 11 November 1773) was a British Army general made famous for his actions during the French and Indian War.

He purchased a commission as ensign on 20 March 1720.  He was promoted to major of the Eighth Horse, in 1742, and served at the Battle of Dettingen in 1743.  In April 1745 he was promoted lieutenant colonel of the regiment, and served at the Battle of Fontenoy. He was promoted to colonel of the 48th Regiment of Foot in 1755.

Seven Years War

Webb sailed to North America as a subordinate of Lord Loudoun who was travelling to become commander-in-chief of Britain's American colonies. Webb is best remembered for his role in the operations around Lake George in 1757, which culminated in the Battle of Fort William Henry. Believing a French prisoner report that the French army of General Louis-Joseph de Montcalm was 11,000 men strong, Webb refused to send any of his estimated 1,600 men north to relieve the besieged garrison at Fort William Henry, since they were all that stood between the French and Albany. General Webb was recalled because of his actions; the influential British Indian agent William Johnson later wrote that Webb was "the only Englishman [I] ever knew who was a coward." In James Fenimore Cooper's novel The Last of the Mohicans, Webb is portrayed as a minor character most noteworthy for declining to send adequate support to Fort William Henry.  In the 1992 film he is portrayed by Mac Andrews.

He obtained the rank of major-general in 1759 and lieutenant-general in 1761.  He died in 1773. His daughter and heiress, Mary, married Henry Theophilus Clements.

Notes

References

British Army generals
1773 deaths
British Army personnel of the War of the Austrian Succession
British Army personnel of the French and Indian War
48th Regiment of Foot officers
Year of birth unknown
14th King's Hussars officers
King's Regiment (Liverpool) officers